Edgewood may refer to:

Places

Canada
Edgewood, British Columbia

South Africa
Edgewood, a University of KwaZulu-Natal campus in Pinetown, South Africa

United States

Cities and towns
Edgewood, California
Edgewood, Florida
Edgewood, Illinois, a village in Effingham County
Edgewood, Boone County, Illinois
Edgewood, Indiana
Edgewood, Iowa
Edgewood, Kentucky
Edgewood, Maryland
Edgewood, Minnesota
Edgewood, Missouri
Edgewood, Nevada
Edgewood, New Mexico
Edgewood, New York
Edgewood, Ohio
Edgewood, Pennsylvania (disambiguation)
Edgewood, Allegheny County, Pennsylvania
Edgewood, Northumberland County, Pennsylvania
Edgewood, Texas 
Edgewood, Washington
Edgewood, West Virginia

Neighborhoods
Edgewood (Atlanta), Georgia
Edgewood, Columbus, Georgia
Edgewood/Candler Park (MARTA station), a passenger rail station
Edgewood (Cranston), Rhode Island
Edgewood (Louisville), Kentucky
Edgewood (New Haven), Connecticut
Edgewood (Washington, D.C.), a neighborhood of Washington, D.C.

National Register of Historic Places
 Edgewood (Montgomery, Alabama), listed on the NRHP in Alabama
 Edgewood Park Historic District, New Haven, CT, listed on the NRHP in Connecticut
 Edgewood Historic District (Venice, Florida), listed on the NRHP in Florida
 Edgewood (Bardstown, Kentucky), listed on the NRHP in Kentucky
 Edgewood (Louisville, Kentucky), listed on the NRHP in Kentucky
 Edgewood (Versailles, Kentucky), listed on the NRHP in Kentucky
 Edgewood (Farmerville, Louisiana), listed on the NRHP in Louisiana
 Edgewood (Frederick, Maryland), listed on the NRHP in Maryland
 Edgewood (Natchez, Mississippi), listed on the NRHP in Mississippi
 Edgewood (Grassy Creek, North Carolina), listed on the NRHP in North Carolina
 Village of Edgewood Historic District, Edgewood, Pennsylvania
 Edgewood (Birmingham Township, Chester County, Pennsylvania), listed on the NRHP in Pennsylvania
 Edgewood Historic District-Taft Estate Plat, Cranston, RI, listed on the NRHP in Rhode Island
 Edgewood, 1818 (Amherst, Virginia), 138 Garland Avenue, listed on the NRHP in Virginia
 Edgewood, 1858 (Amherst, Virginia), 591 Puppy Creek Road, listed on the NRHP in Virginia
 Edgewood Plantation and Harrison's Mill, listed on the NRHP in Virginia
 Edgewood (Stanleytown, Virginia), listed on the NRHP in Virginia
 Edgewood (Wingina, Virginia), listed on the NRHP in Virginia
 Edgewood (Bunker Hill, West Virginia), listed on the NRHP in West Virginia
 Edgewood Historic District (Charleston, West Virginia), listed on the NRHP in West Virginia
 Woodsdale-Edgewood Neighborhood Historic District, Wheeling, West Virginia, listed on the NRHP in West Virginia
 Edgewood College Mound Group Archeological District, Madison, WI, listed on the NRHP in Wisconsin

Other U.S. places
Edgewood Chemical Activity, a U.S. army depot
Edgewood College, in Madison, Wisconsin
Edgewood State Hospital, in Suffolk County, New York

Other uses
Edgewood station (disambiguation), stations of the name

See also
Edgewood Historic District (disambiguation)
Edgewood Park (disambiguation)
Edgewood Plantation (disambiguation)
Edgewood School (disambiguation)